Marquis of Mandal was a title of the Norwegian nobility. Mandal lies in Southern Norway.

The title was given to the Italians Francisco di Ratta (died 1716) and to his nephews Giuseppe di Ratta (died 1725) and Luigi di Ratta of Bologna by Frederick IV of Norway on 24 November 1710. Neither Francisco di Ratta, Marquis of Mandal, nor Giuseppe di Ratta, Marquis of Mandal, was married. Luigi di Ratta, Marquis of Mandal, was married. His family became patrilineally extinct with the death of his great-grandson, Benedetto di Ratta, Marquis of Mandal (born 1809).

The coat of arms of the Marquis of Mandal is described in the Encyclopedia of Noble Families in Denmark, Norway, and the Duchies (Lexicon over adelige familier i Danmark, Norge og Hertugdømmerne). A book by Amund Helland cites the following description in Danish:

In English:

See also 
 Marquis of Lista

Literature 
 Helland, Amund: Topografisk-statistisk beskrivelse over Lister og Mandals amt : Første del : Den almindelige del 1903, Kristiania P. 643f.
 Kurrild-Klitgaard, Peter (2009). "Danish-Norwegian nobiliary titles for Italian gentlemen." Rivista Araldica: Rivista del Collegio Araldico 2008, 55–62.

 
Norwegian noble titles
Mandal, Norway